HM Prison Maidstone is a Category C men's prison, located in Maidstone, Kent, England. The prison is operated by His Majesty's Prison Service.

History
Maidstone Prison is one of the oldest penal institutions in the United Kingdom, having been in operation for over 200 years.

Originally serving as a county jail, Maidstone was converted to a prison during the 1740s. During his visits to the prison, reformer John Howard reported poor living conditions at the prison including overcrowding and poor ventilation. However, conditions would remain unchanged until a reconstruction of the prison took place under the supervision of Daniel Asher Alexander, who had worked on the construction of Dartmoor Prison, lasting from 1811 until its completion in 1819 at a cost of £200,000.  Also involved in the design of Maidstone Prison was Kent architect John Whichcord Snr, who was Surveyor to the County of Kent from the 1820s.  Mr Whichcord is probably best known for designing the Kent County Lunatic Asylum in the 1830s, also in Maidstone, and similarities between the two buildings are apparent.

Constructed using Kentish Ragstone from a local quarry, the original design of the prison was intended to house 552 prisoners, including 62 female inmates. The first 141 prisoners arrived in March 1819.

Over the next decade, additions to the prison were made including a courthouse in 1826 as well as individual cells, dayrooms, courtyards and offices attributed to suggestions made by Howard. Other reforms later included a strictly enforced segregation of prisoners by offence and the general improvement of living conditions such as improving the water supply, sanitation and ventilation systems, many of these renovations were made with prison labour over the course of the century.

By the late 20th century, the only remaining signs of the original prison are the large and small roundhouses, the Weald Wing, the Administrative Block, the Training Complex, the Visits Building and the perimeter wall.

In August 2007, Weald Wing was closed when Legionella bacteria was discovered in the water supply. Approximately 80 prisoners were dispersed to other prisons.
At the end of January 2009, it was announced that the prison would become a sex offenders' unit.

Present-day
Maidstone accommodates foreign national prisoners convicted of a range of offences; many are deported at the end of their sentence. The prison is classed as a "training prison" and it includes a print shop and brick works. A good deal of work is carried out on the gardens, they frequently win awards, and a new environmental garden area is being developed.

Notable inmates
Jonathan King, imprisoned in Maidstone from 2001–2005 for four indecent assaults and two serious sexual offences.
Reggie Kray, notorious gangster married Roberta Jones in Maidstone prison on 14 July 1997

Media appearances
The exterior of Maidstone Prison was shown in the title sequence (and some episodes) of the 1970s BBC comedy series Porridge and the 1990s BBC comedy series Birds of a Feather.

References

Further reading
Roth, Mitchel P. Prisons and Prison Systems: A Global Encyclopedia. Westport, Connecticut: Greenwood Publishing Group, 2006. 
Whitfield, Dick, ed. The State of Prisons – 200 Years On. London: Routledge Press, 1991.

External links
History of Maidstone Prison from theprison.org.uk 
 Ministry of Justice pages on Maidstone

Maidstone
Maidstone
1819 establishments in England
Maidstone
Buildings and structures in Maidstone